Pennington is a northern suburb of Adelaide, South Australia, located about 10 km from the Adelaide city centre. It is located in the City of Charles Sturt.

The suburb is residential, apart from a light industrial pocket to the south.

History
The area now including Pennington was subdivided in 1909 by Captain Alfred Hodgeman, who named a section after his wife, the former Helen Pennington. The Pennington Post Office opened on 1 May 1939 and closed in 1997.

Pennington was the site of a migrant hostel from 1950 until it closed in 1985. It was known as Finsbury Hostel from 1949 to 1966, then renamed to Pennington. It initially consisted of Nissen huts, Romney huts and Quonset huts, mostly second hand Army surplus. The huts provided dormitory and family accommodation, with separate dining, recreation and latrine buildings. Despite official closure, accommodation continued for migrants up to the mid-1990s.

Demographics

The 2006 Census by the Australian Bureau of Statistics counted 3,601 persons in Pennington on census night. Of these, 49.7% were male (and 50.3% were female).

The majority of residents (61.2%) are of Australian birth, with other common census responses being Vietnam (11.2%) and England (3.0%).

The age distribution of Pennington residents is comparable to that of the greater Australian population. 66.9% of residents were over 25 years in 2006, compared to the Australian average of 66.5%; (and 33.1% were younger than 25 years, compared to the Australian average of 33.5%).

Community
Phap Hoa Temple is located on Butler Avenue next to Pennington Primary School.

Schools
The suburb includes Pennington Primary School and the R-2 campus of Pennington Junior Primary School. Mount Carmel Primary School is also in Pennington.

Attractions
There are shops and medical practices on Addison Road.

Parks
The largest park in Pennington lies between Butler Court, Booker Court and Windsor Avenue.

The Pennington Oval on Butler Avenue provides a venue for regular local sporting fixtures.

Transport

Roads
The suburb is served by the following main roads:
 Grand Junction Road, running east–west from Vista to Queenstown
Addison Road, running through the middle of Pennington.
Torrens Road, running northwest from North Adelaide, terminates in Pennington.

Public transport
Pennington is served by public transport run by Adelaide Metro.

Trains
There is no train stop in Pennington itself; the closest statian is St Clair
Timetable
Route map

Buses
Grand Junction Road is served by the 230, 232, 254 and the 254X express bus services. Torrens Road is served by the 230 and 232 services. Park Avenue and Northgate Streets are served by the 252 service.

See also
 List of Adelaide suburbs

References

External links

City of Charles Sturt
Local Government Association of SA – City of Charles Sturt
2006 ABS Census Data by Location

Suburbs of Adelaide
Populated places established in 1909
1909 establishments in Australia